State Route 707 (SR 707) is a  east–west state highway in the western portion of the U.S. state of Ohio.

Route description
The entirety of SR 707 is situated within the northern half of Mercer County.  No portion of the route is included within the National Highway System (NHS).  The NHS is a network of highways identified as being most important for the economy, mobility and defense of the nation.

History
SR 707 was established in 1937.  It has maintained the same routing through the northern portion of Mercer County throughout its history.

Major intersections

References

707
Transportation in Mercer County, Ohio